Susannah Harrison (1752–1784) was an English working-class religious poet. Her 1780 collection Songs in the Night went through at least twenty-one editions in Britain and America, making it "one of the best selling collections written by a laboring-class poet in the late eighteenth century".

Harrison was a domestic servant who taught herself to read and write. Aged twenty, she suffered an illness from which she did not expect to survive and gave manuscripts of her poetry to John Condor, a Congregationalist Minister, who edited and published her poems for her. She died 3 August 1784 in Ipswich.

Works
 Songs in the Night, 1780

See also
List of 18th-century British working-class writers

References

External links
 Susannah Harrison at hymnary.org

1752 births
1784 deaths
18th-century English poets
Calvinist and Reformed poets
Christian poets
Christian hymnwriters
English hymnwriters
English women poets
18th-century British women writers
British women hymnwriters
18th-century English women
18th-century English people